David Smith (born 1953) is an English former professional rugby league footballer who played in the 1970s and 1980s.

Background
David Smith was born in Dewsbury, West Riding of Yorkshire, England, he has worked as a wholesale butcher.

Playing career

International honours
David Smith won caps for England while at Wakefield Trinity in 1975 against Australia, and while at Leeds in 1977 against France.

County honours
David Smith won cap(s) for Yorkshire while at Wakefield Trinity.

Challenge Cup Final appearances
David Smith played as an interchange/substitute (replacing , i.e. number 2, Alan Smith) in Leeds' 16–7 victory over Widnes in the 1977 Challenge Cup Final during the 1976–77 season at Wembley Stadium, London on Saturday 7 May 1977, in front of a crowd of 80,871, and played , i.e. number 2, in the 14–12 victory over St. Helens in the 1978 Challenge Cup Final during the 1977–78 season at Wembley Stadium, London on Saturday 13 May 1978, in front of a crowd of 96,000.

County Cup Final appearances
David Smith played , i.e. number 2, in Wakefield Trinity's 2–7 defeat by Leeds in the 1973 Yorkshire County Cup Final during the 1973–74 season at Headingley Rugby Stadium, Leeds on Saturday 20 October 1973, and played , and scored a try in the 13–16 defeat by Hull Kingston Rovers in the 1974 Yorkshire County Cup Final during the 1974–75 season at Headingley Rugby Stadium, Leeds on Saturday 26 October 1974, played , i.e. number 5, in Leeds' 16–12 victory over Featherstone Rovers in the 1976 Yorkshire County Cup Final during the 1976–77 season at Headingley Rugby Stadium, Leeds on Saturday 16 October 1976, played right-, i.e. number 3, and scored a try in the 15–6 victory over Halifax in the 1979 Yorkshire County Cup Final during the 1979–80 season at Headingley Rugby Stadium, Leeds on Saturday 27 October 1979, played right- in the 8–7 victory over Hull Kingston Rovers in the 1980 Yorkshire County Cup Final during the 1980–81 season at Fartown Ground, Huddersfield on Saturday 8 November 1980, and played as an interchange/substitute (replacing  Steve Pullen) in Bradford Northern's 7–18 defeat by Hull F.C. in the 1982 Yorkshire County Cup Final during the 1982–83 season at Elland Road, Leeds on Saturday 2 October 1982.

Club career
David Smith made his début for Wakefield Trinity during August 1971, he appears to have scored no drop-goals (or field-goals as they are currently known in Australasia), but prior to the 1974–75 season all goals, whether; conversions, penalties, or drop-goals, scored 2-points, consequently prior to this date drop-goals were often not explicitly documented, therefore '0' drop-goals may indicate drop-goals not recorded, rather than no drop-goals scored.

Career records
Fred Smith's record for the most tries for Wakefield Trinity in a season set during the 1959–60 season with 38-tries was equalled by David Smith in the 1973–74 season.

References

External links
Photograph "David Smith held short" at rlhp.co.uk
Photograph "Hanley tears down the wing" at rlhp.co.uk
Photograph "Gary Van Bellen goes over" at rlhp.co.uk
Photograph "Disappointment" at rlhp.co.uk
Photograph "Bradford Northern's Yorkshire Cup squad 1982" at rlhp.co.uk
Photograph "Northern's Cup semi final squad 1983" at rlhp.co.uk
Photograph "Peter Fox gives his pre match talk" at rlhp.co.uk
Photograph "A proud Robinson" at rlhp.co.uk

1953 births
Living people
Bradford Bulls players
Carlisle RLFC players
England national rugby league team players
English rugby league players
Leeds Rhinos players
Rugby league players from Dewsbury
Rugby league wingers
Wakefield Trinity players
Workington Town players
Yorkshire rugby league team players